Woolstaston is a small village and civil parish in Shropshire, England, south of Shrewsbury and north of the nearest town, Church Stretton.

It is located in the northern foothills of the Long Mynd and is situated near Leebotwood, Smethcott and Picklescott. The parish is geographically very small, covering only the village, the lanes leading to it and a small part of the Walkmills area to the north-east. The area also contains the Rectory Farm Bed & Breakfast.

The village has a Church of England parish church dedicated to St Michael, dating to the 13th century but restored in its present form in 1864-65 when a transept, vestry and bell turret were added.

Lalage Bown (1927-2021), educator, feminist and women's literacy advocate in Africa, was brought up in Woolstaston and her ashes were scattered in the churchyard.

See also
Listed buildings in Woolstaston

References

External links

Civil parishes in Shropshire
Villages in Shropshire
Shrewsbury and Atcham